Josu Muguruza (1958–1989) was a Basque journalist and politician who was assassinated in Madrid on 20 November 1989. Muguruza was among the leaders of Herri Batasuna, a Basque nationalist political party. He was about to serve at the Spanish Parliament for the party when he was killed.

Biography
Muguruza was born in Bilbao in 1958. He received a bachelor's degree in information sciences. He was a journalist by profession and worked as an editor-in-chief of Egin newspaper. He was elected as a deputy from the Herri Batasuna in the 1989 general elections. 

He had a daughter, Ane Muguruza. She was born two weeks after the murder of his father.

Assassination
Muguruza was assassinated in Madrid on 20 November 1989 before he received his certificate of election. He was dining at a restaurant of Hotel Alcalá. The perpetrators were the members of an anti-ETA group known as GAL. Ricardo Sáenz Ynestrillas, a member of the neo-fascist group, Spanish Social Movement (Moviemiento Social Espanol), was arrested and tried for his alleged involvement in the killing of Muguruza, but soon released due to the lack of evidence. Later a former police officer, Ángel Duce Hernández, was arrested on 2 August 1990 and was sentenced to 100 years for the murder of Josu Muguruza. Duce was killed in a traffic accident in Alcorcón in August 1997 while he was using a six-day prison permit.

Funeral and legacy
A funeral ceremony was held for Muguruza in Bilbao on 23 November 1989. A monumental sculpture was erected in his honor in Bilbao.

The day, 20 November, Muguruza was assassinated has been commemorated by the Basque people since on the same day another Herri Batasuna leader Santiago Brouard was assassinated in 1984.

References

External links

20th-century Spanish journalists
1958 births
1989 deaths
Assassinated Spanish journalists
Assassinated Spanish politicians
Politicians from Bilbao
Spanish newspaper editors
Members of the 4th Congress of Deputies (Spain)
Herri Batasuna politicians